Brenda Coultas is an American poet.

Life
She was raised in Indiana, often working odd jobs such as welding.

She graduated from Naropa University, studying with Anne Waldman and Allen Ginsberg.  Coultas also taught at Naropa University.

She moved to New York City in 1994. With Eleni Sikelianos, she worked at the Poetry Project in NYC, edited the Poetry Project Newsletter

In 2003, she was a visiting poet at Long Island University. She lives in the Bowery.

Her work has also been published Brooklyn Rail, Trickhouse, the Denver Review, and in two collections: An Anthology of New (American) Poets (Talisman 1996), and conjunctions 35 "American Poetry: States of the Art" (Fall 2000).

Awards
 2004 Norma Farber First Book Award, A Handmade Museum''
 Greenwald grant from the Academy of American Poets
 2005 New York Foundation for the Arts (NYFA)
 Lower Manhattan Cultural Council artist-in-residence.

Work

Poetry

Anthologies

References

External links
 "every other day", Kicking Wind, 19 July 2006
 "Brenda Coultas", PennSound

Year of birth missing (living people)
Living people
Naropa University alumni
Naropa University faculty
People from Indiana
American women poets
American women academics
21st-century American women